The 2012 Curling Masters Champéry were held from October 26 to 28 at the Palladium de Champéry in Champéry, Switzerland as part of the 2012–13 World Curling Tour. The event was held in a round robin format, and the purse for the event was 40,000 CHF. Marcus Hasselborg defeated Peter de Cruz in the final with a score of 5–4.

Teams
The teams are listed as follows:

Round-robin standings
Final round-robin standings

Playoffs
The playoffs draw is listed as follows:

References

External links

2012 in curling
2012 in Swiss sport
Sport in Valais
Curling competitions in Switzerland
International sports competitions hosted by Switzerland